Charles James "Buddy" Robinson III (born September 30, 1991) is an American professional ice hockey forward currently with the Rockford IceHogs in the American Hockey League (AHL) while under contract to the Chicago Blackhawks of the National Hockey League (NHL).

Playing career
Raised in Bellmawr, New Jersey, Robinson attended Gloucester Catholic High School.  Robinson played two seasons of collegiate hockey with Lake Superior State University of the Central Collegiate Hockey Association.

Undrafted, he was signed by the Senators to a three-year entry level contract on March 25, 2013.

While playing mostly in the AHL with the Senators affiliate, the Binghamton Senators, Robinson did play three games with the NHL Ottawa Senators in April 2016 and scored his first NHL goal in a 3–1 win over the Florida Panthers. He added an assist a game later and finished with 1 goal, 1 assist, +2 in those three games.

On June 23, 2016, the Senators re-signed Robinson to a one-year, two-way deal. In the following 2016–17 season, Robinson was assigned and returned to the Binghamton Senators to start the year. He appeared in a further 4 scoreless games with Ottawa, before he was traded to the San Jose Sharks, along with Zack Stortini and a 7th round draft pick in the 2017 draft, in exchange for Tommy Wingels on January 24, 2016. He was immediately assigned to AHL affiliate, the San Jose Barracuda.

On July 1, 2017, Robinson signed a one-year, two-way deal with the Winnipeg Jets. In the 2017–18 season, Robinson played 74 games with the Jets' AHL affiliate, the Manitoba Moose, finishing third in scoring with 25 goals and 28 assists for 53 points.

Having concluded his contract with the Jets, Robinson left as a free agent to sign a two-year, two-way contract with the Calgary Flames on July 2, 2018.

Robinson returned to the NHL with the Flames on January 28, 2020 in Calgary against the St. Louis Blues.

On October 9, 2020, Robinson signed a one-year contract extension with the Flames. In the pandemic delayed  season, Robinson remained with the Flames for the duration of the season, largely assigned to the club's extended Taxi Squad. He featured in 9 regular season games, going scoreless.

On July 29, 2021, Robinson signed to a one-year, two-way contract with the Anaheim Ducks as a free agent. After beginning the  season in the AHL with affiliate, San Diego Gulls, Robinson was recalled by the Ducks and appeared in a career best 32 regular season games, collecting 1 goal and 5 assists for 6 points.

As a free agent from his lone season with the Ducks, Robinson was signed to a one-year, two-way contract with the Chicago Blackhawks on July 25, 2022.

Personal
His brother Eric currently plays for the  Columbus Blue Jackets of the NHL.

Career statistics

References

External links

1991 births
Living people
American men's ice hockey left wingers
Anaheim Ducks players
Binghamton Senators players
Calgary Flames players
Chicago Blackhawks players
Elmira Jackals (ECHL) players
Gloucester Catholic High School alumni
People from Bellmawr, New Jersey
Sportspeople from Camden County, New Jersey
Ice hockey players from New Jersey
Lake Superior State Lakers men's ice hockey players
Manitoba Moose players
Ottawa Senators players
Rockford IceHogs (AHL) players
San Diego Gulls (AHL) players
San Jose Barracuda players
Stockton Heat players
Undrafted National Hockey League players